New Delhi Station is a station on the Yellow Line of the Delhi Metro. It is within walking distance from the Indian Railways New Delhi railway station. It is on the New Delhi Metro (Platform Number 16) side of the New Delhi Railway Station.

The Airport Express also terminates at New Delhi Metro Station. Check-in facilities of some of the carriers including Air India are available at this station.

A skywalk connecting the station with the New Delhi railway station was opened to the public in February 2022.

Station layout

Connections

Delhi Transport Corporation bus routes number 39STL, 120B, 172, 213, 213A, 307A, 308, 430A, 433, 433CL, 433LSTL, 440A, 445, 445A, 453, 454, 457, 458, 460A, 467, 500, 522SPL, 604, 622, 716, 728A, 781, 840EXT, 853, 910A, 949, Airport Exp- 4, RL-75, RL-77A, RL-77B, RL-77Ext, RL-79 serves the station.

See also
List of Delhi Metro stations
Transport in Delhi
Delhi Metro Rail Corporation
Delhi Suburban Railway
Delhi Transport Corporation
North Delhi
National Capital Region (India)
List of rapid transit systems
List of metro systems

References

External links

 Delhi Metro Rail Corporation Ltd. (Official site) 
 Delhi Metro Annual Reports
 
 UrbanRail.Net — descriptions of all metro systems in the world, each with a schematic map showing all stations.

Delhi Metro stations
Railway stations opened in 2005
Railway stations in Central Delhi district